The Grand Prix Lago le Bandie is a cyclo-cross race held in Treviso, Italy, which is part of the UCI Cyclo-cross World Cup.

Past winners

References
 Men's results
 Women's results

UCI Cyclo-cross World Cup
Cycle races in Italy
Cyclo-cross races
Recurring sporting events established in 2006
2006 establishments in Italy